Eunota togata, the white-cloaked tiger beetle, is a species of tiger beetle in the family Cicindelidae. It was formerly known as Cicindela togata.

Subspecies
Four subspecies of Eunota togata are recognised:

 Eunota togata globicollis (Casey, 1913) (including former subspecies Eunota togata fascinans (Casey, 1914))
 Eunota togata latilabris (Willis, 1967)
 Eunota togata leucophasma Acciavati, 2021
 Eunota togata togata (LaFerté-Sénectère, 1841)

Description

Habitat
The beetle likes salt. It prefers salty marshes, flats, and saline lakeshores.

References

Cicindelidae
Beetles described in 1841